British Aerospace plc (BAe) was a British aircraft, munitions and defence-systems manufacturer. Its head office was at Warwick House in the Farnborough Aerospace Centre in Farnborough, Hampshire. Formed in 1977, in 1999 it purchased Marconi Electronic Systems, the defence electronics and naval shipbuilding subsidiary of the General Electric Company plc, to form BAE Systems.

History

Formation and privatisation
The company has its origins in the Aircraft and Shipbuilding Industries Act 1977, which called for the nationalisation and merger of the British Aircraft Corporation, Hawker Siddeley Aviation, Hawker Siddeley Dynamics and Scottish Aviation. On 29 April 1977, the new entity was formed in the United Kingdom as a statutory corporation.

Under the provisions of the British Aerospace Act 1980 on 1 January the statutory corporation was transferred to a limited company, which then re-registered as a public limited company (plc), under the name "British Aerospace Public Limited Company", on 2 January 1981. BAe was privatised in two main phases, the first in February 1981, involving 51.6% shares of the company, during which the public sale was 3.5 times subscribed and at the end of the first day's trading, share prices were 14% above the original offer price. The second phase occurred in May 1985, in which 48.4% shares were sold; this sale was 5.4 times subscribed and the first day closing price was 11% above the initial offer price. Despite this privatisation, the British Government maintained a £1 golden share, which allowed it to veto foreign control of the board or company.

Programmes

Prior to the formation of British Aerospace, its predecessors were involved in several aircraft programmes. Scottish Aviation was working on a project for a 19-seat turboprop airliner, an upgraded version of the Handley Page Jetstream. BAe continued development and placed the Jetstream 31 into production after the first flight of the prototype in March 1980. At the same time, production of Hawker Siddeley’s HS 125 business jet, Harrier VTOL jet fighter and HS 748 turboprop airliner continued under BAe, as did the that of the Trident jet airliner for a short time. Similarly, low-rate production of the British Aircraft Corporation‘s One-Eleven jet airliner and Strikemaster two-seat military jet trainer/attack aircraft — and the iconic Concorde supersonic airliner — also continued. 

On 29 July 1976, less than a year prior to BAe's formation, the contract for production of the first batch of the Panavia Tornado, an advanced nuclear-capable fighter bomber, was signed. It was developed and produced via a multinational company, Panavia Aircraft GmbH, of which BAe was one of several companies to be heavily involved. On 10 July 1979, the maiden flight of a production Tornado occurred. On 5 and 6 June 1979, the first aircraft were delivered to the RAF and German Air Force respectively. On 25 September 1981, the first Italian Tornado was delivered. 

The Tornado would be produced in large numbers, the 500th aircraft to be completed was delivered to West Germany on 19 December 1987. Production of the Tornado ended in 1998, the final batch being delivered to the Royal Saudi Air Force, that had ordered a total of 96 IDS Tornados. Aviation author Jon Lake noted that "The Trinational Panavia Consortium produced just short of 1,000 Tornados, making it one of the most successful postwar bomber programs".

In 1978, BAe relaunched the BAe 146, a short-haul regional airliner that had been previously worked on by Hawker Siddeley. The company marketed it as a quiet and economic turbofan-powered compact airliner that could replace the previous generation of turboprop-powered feeder aircraft. In 1982, the first completed aircraft made its first flight. Upon its launch into service the following year, it was hailed as being "the world's quietest jetliner". In 1993, an upgraded model of the BAe 146, referred to as the Avro RJ series, superseded the original; changes included the replacement of the original Lycoming ALF 502 turbofan engines by higher-thrust LF 507 turbofan engines, which were housed in redesigned nacelles. The Avro RJ series also featured a modernised cockpit with EFIS replacing the analogue ADI, HSI, and engine instrumentation. Production of the Avro RJ ended with the final four aircraft being delivered in late 2003; a total of 173 Avro RJ aircraft was delivered between 1993 and 2003.

BAe developed several advanced models of the Harrier family. In 1978, the Royal Navy received the first BAe Sea Harrier of an initial order for 24. The Sea Harrier was declared operational three years later, being initially embarked on both the first Invincible class aircraft carrier HMS Invincible, and the older HMS Hermes. Following their decisive role in the 1982 Falklands War, several of the lessons learnt from the conflict shaped a new upgrade programme for the fleet authorised in 1984, resulting in the Sea Harrier FRS.2 (later known as FA2). The first flight of the prototype took place in September 1988 and a contract was signed for 29 upgraded aircraft in December of that year. The Sea Harrier FA2 was fitted with the Blue Vixen radar, which was described as one of the most advanced pulse doppler radar systems in the world.

In August 1981, BAe and the American aircraft manufacturer McDonnell Douglas signed a memorandum of understanding regarding the McDonnell Douglas AV-8B Harrier II. Under this agreement, BAe was effectively a subcontractor rather than a full partner, receiving 40 percent of the airframe's work-share in terms of man-hours. Production took place at McDonnell Douglas' facilities in suburban St. Louis, Missouri, and manufacturing by BAe at its Kingston and Dunsfold facilities in Surrey, England. The variant procured for the RAF, which was known as the BAe Harrier II, featured many differences, including avionics fit, armaments and equipment; the wing of the GR5 featured a stainless steel leading edge, giving it different flex characteristics from the AV-8B. In December 1989, the first RAF squadron to be equipped with the Harrier II was declared operational.

In 1979, BAe officially joined the multinational aircraft manufacturer Airbus and acquired a 20% share in the venture, the move effectively reversed a decision made ten years prior in which the UK government had withdrawn its support for the Airbus consortium. Airbus' first aircraft, the A300, had been received with little initial demand, but orders for the airliner had picked up in the late 1970s. By 1979, the consortium had 256 orders for A300, and Airbus had launched its second airliner, the A310, less than 12 months prior to BAe formally joining the consortium. As time went on, it was becoming clear that Airbus was no longer a temporary collaboration to produce a single design as per its original mission statement; it had become a long-term brand for the development of further aircraft. By the late 1980s, work had begun on a pair of new wide-body airliners, the biggest to be produced at this point under the Airbus name; these would be launched in the 1990s as the Airbus A330 and the Airbus A340.

During the 1983 Paris Air Show, the launch of the Experimental Aircraft Programme (EAP) to develop and fly an advanced fighter technology demonstrator was announced; at this point, the effort was intended to be a partnership between Britain and several of its European neighbours, including West Germany and Italy. The resulting aircraft, the British Aerospace EAP, ended up being primarily developed by BAe as a private venture; it formed the basis for the multinational Eurofighter Typhoon. In 1986, in conjunction Alenia Aeronautica, CASA and DASA, BAe formed Eurofighter GmbH for the development and production of the Eurofighter. The multinational organisation's head office was established in Hallbergmoos, Bavaria, Germany. The maiden flight of the Eurofighter prototype took place in Bavaria on 27 March 1994, flown by DASA chief test pilot Peter Weger. On 30 January 1998, the first production contract for the Eurofighter was signed between Eurofighter GmbH, engine manufacturer Eurojet and the NATO Eurofighter and Tornado Management Agency, the organisation set up to manage the procurement of the aircraft.

On 26 September 1985, the UK and Saudi Arabian governments signed the Al-Yamamah arms deal with BAe as prime contractor. The contracts, extended in the 1990s and never fully detailed, involved the supply of Panavia Tornado strike and air defence aircraft, BAe Hawk trainer jets, Rapier missile systems, infrastructure works and naval vessels. The Al Yamamah deals are valued at anything up to £20 billion and still continue to provide a large percentage of BAE Systems' profits.

Acquisitions and restructuring
On 22 April 1987, BAe acquired Royal Ordnance, the British armaments manufacturer, for £190 million. Subsequently, the German armaments specialist Heckler & Koch was folded into this division following its acquisition by BAe four years later.

In 1988, BAe purchased the Rover Group from the British government of Margaret Thatcher for £150 million. The sale was controversial due to opaque financial arrangements between the government and BAe; however the House of Commons Trade and Industry Committee was said to believe that "in spite of a catalogue of complaints, the committee concludes that the sale to BAe may well have been the best solution for the government."

In 1991, BAe acquired a 30% interest in Hutchison Telecommunications through a stock swap deal, where Hutchison was given a controlling stake of 65% in BAe's wholly owned subsidiary – Microtel Communications Ltd. In August 1991, BAe formed a naval systems joint venture, BAeSEMA, with the Sema Group. BAe acquired Sema's 50% share in 1998. That year also saw BAe begin to experience major difficulties. BAe saw its share price fall below 100p for the first time. On 9 September 1991, the company issued a profits warning and later that week "bungled" the launch of a £432 million rights issue. On 25 September 1991 BAe directors led by CEO Richard Evans ousted the Chairman Professor Sir Roland Smith in a move described by The Independent as "one of the most spectacular and brutal boardroom coups witnessed in many years." Evans described the troubles as a confluence of events:
 "our property company [Arlington Securities] was hit with a lousy market. Sales of the Rover Group sank by about a fifth and losses mounted. The government's defence spending volumes underwent a major review. Losses in our commercial aerospace division increased dramatically with the recession in the airline industry."

In mid-1992, BAe wrote off £1 billion of assets, largely as part of redundancies and restructuring of its regional aircraft division. This was the largest asset write-off in UK corporate history. General Electric Company (GEC), later to sell its defence interests to BAe, came close to acquiring BAe at this time. BAe cut 47% of its workforce (60,000 out of 127,000), 40,000 of which were from the regional aircraft division.

Evans decided to sell non-core business activities which included The Rover Group, Arlington Securities, BAe Corporate Jets, BAe Communications and Ballast Nedam. Although the rationale of diversification was sound (to shield the company from cyclical aerospace and defence markets) the struggling company could not afford to continue the position: "We simply could not afford to carry two core businesses, cars and aerospace. At one point Rover was eating up about £2 billion of our banking capacity." BAe Corporate Jets Ltd and Arkansas Aerospace Inc were sold to Raytheon in 1993. In 1994, the Rover Group was sold to BMW and British Aerospace Space Systems was sold to Matra Marconi Space. In 1998, BAe's shareholding of Orange plc was reduced to 5%. The Orange shareholding was a legacy of the 30% stake in Hutchison Telecommunications (UK) Ltd.

In 1994, BAeSEMA, Siemens Plessey and GEC-Marconi formed UKAMS Limited as part of the Principal Anti-Air Missile System (PAAMS) consortium. UKAMS would become a wholly owned subsidiary of BAe Dynamics in 1998. In 1995, Saab Military Aircraft and BAe signed an agreement for the joint development and marketing of the export version of the JAS 39 Gripen. In 1996, BAe and Matra Defense agreed to merge their missile businesses into a joint venture called Matra BAe Dynamics. In 1997, BAe joined the Lockheed Martin X-35 Joint Strike Fighter team. The following year, BAe acquired the UK operations of Siemens Plessey Systems (SPS) from Siemens, while DASA purchased SPS' German assets.

In the 1990s, BAe was the largest exporter based in the United Kingdom; a Competition Commission report released in 2005 calculated a ten-year aggregate figure of £45 billion, with defence sales accounting for approximately 80%.

Transition to BAE Systems
In the late 1990s, European defence consolidation became a prevailing practice; European governments wished to see the merger of their defence manufacturers into a single entity, a European Aerospace and Defence Company. This ambition led to numerous reports linking various European defence groups – mainly with each other but also with American defence contractors. In July 1998, merger discussions began between BAe and DASA. Terms for such a merger had been reportedly agreed between British Aerospace Chairman Richard Evans and DASA CEO Jürgen Schrempp in December 1998. However, when the British General Electric Company (GEC) put its defence electronics business Marconi Electronic Systems (MES) up for sale on 22 December 1998, BAe's management opted to abandon the DASA merger in favour of purchasing its British rival. During 2004, Evans stated that his fear was that an American defence contractor would acquire MES and challenge both British Aerospace and DASA.

Schrempp was angered by BAe's reversal, and opted to pursue other partner companies for DASA to merge with. On 11 June 1999, the Spanish aircraft company CASA a memorandum of understanding for such a merger. On 14 October 1999, DASA agreed to merge with Aérospatiale-Matra to create the European Aeronautic Defence and Space Company (EADS). 10 July 2000 was "day one" for the new company, which became the world's second-largest aerospace company after Boeing and the second-largest European arms manufacturer after BAE Systems.

The GEC merger to create a solely British company, compared to the prospective Anglo-German company that would have resulted from merging with DASA, was promoted as having superior prospects for further penetration of the lucrative defence market of the United States. The newly combined company, which was initially referred to as "New British Aerospace", was officially formed on 30 November 1999; it is named BAE Systems.

Products

Aircraft production

 British Aerospace 125
 British Aerospace 146 (Series −100, −200 and −300 aircraft.  Also includes Avro RJ series)
 British Aerospace P.125
 British Aerospace P.1216
 British Aerospace ATP
 British Aerospace EAP
 British Aerospace Harrier II
 British Aerospace Hawk
 British Aerospace Hawk 200
 BAe Hawker 800
 British Aerospace Jetstream
 British Aerospace Jetstream 41
 British Aerospace Nimrod AEW.3
 BAE Nimrod MRA.4
 BAE Replica
 British Aerospace Sea Harrier
 BAe / Aerospatiale Concorde
 BAe Avro 748
 BAe Avro vulcan
 BAC/BAe Strikemaster
 BAe Buccaneer
 BAe Canberra
 BAe Lightning
 BAe Jetstream
 BAe Victor
 Hawker / BAe Hunter
 Hawker / BAe Harrier
 Harrier jump jet
 Hawker / BAe Nimrod
 Hawker / BAe Nimrod R1
 BAe / Hawker Trident
 BAe Provost
 Mcdonnel Douglas / BAe HarrierII
 BAe / McDonnell Douglas Goshawk
 BAe / Saab Gripen
  BAe Bulldog
 BAe Vickers VC10
 Eurofighter Typhoon
 Panavia Tornado
 Panavia Tornado ADV
 SEPECAT Jaguar

Airliner wing production

 Airbus A300
 Airbus A310
 Airbus A320 family
 Airbus A330
 Airbus A340
 Airbus Beluga
 Avion de Transport Supersonique Futur – project

Missiles

 ALARM
 Rapier
 Sea Dart
 Sea Eagle
 Sea Skua
 Sea Wolf
 Skyflash
 PAAMS
 Skylark sounding rocket
 S225XR

Unmanned Air Vehicles
 BAe Flybac
 BAE Systems Phoenix
 BAE SkyEye
 BAe Stabileye

Space hardware

 Giotto probe
 HOTOL
 Olympus-1
 Orbital Test Satellite
 Skynet (satellites)

Security Systems
 CONDOR CONtraband DetectOR
 Vehicle Cargo X-Ray Systems

Corruption investigation and criticisms

There have been allegations that the Al Yamamah contracts were a result of bribes ("douceurs") to members of the Saudi royal family and government officials. Some allegations suggested that the former Prime Minister's son Mark Thatcher may have been involved; he has strongly denied receiving payments or exploiting his mother's connections in his business dealings. The National Audit Office investigated the contracts and has so far never released its conclusions – the only NAO report ever to be withheld. The BBC's Newsnight observed that it is ironic that the once classified report analysing the construction of MI5's Thames House and MI6's Vauxhall Cross headquarters has been released, but the Al Yamamah report is still deemed too sensitive.

The 2007 documentary film Welcome Aboard Toxic Airlines contained evidence that vital data was withheld from a 1999–2000 Australian Senate Inquiry into the health and flight safety issues relating to oil fumes on the British Aerospace 146. The film also contains an Australian Senator’s speech about money being paid by BAe for silence on the fumes issue.

See also

 Aerospace industry in the United Kingdom
 Hawker Siddeley Company
 Rover Group

References

Citations

Bibliography

 .
 .
 .
 Hewish, Mark. "Britain's First New Airliner for 18 years." New Scientist, 94(1311), 24 June 1982. pp. 857–859.
 Jackson, Paul, Kenneth Munson, Lindsay Peacock and John W. R. Taylor, eds. Jane's All The World's Aircraft 1997–98. London: Jane's Information Group, 1998. .
 Lake, Jon. Great Book of Bombers. Minneapolis, Minnesota: Zenith Imprint, 2002. .
 .
 .
 Velupillai, David. "British Aerospace 146 Described." Flight International, 2 May 1981. pp. 1243–1253.
 .

External links

 British Aerospace (Archive)
 British Aerospace UK at BAE Systems website
 British Aerospace Australia at BAE Systems website

1977 establishments in England
1999 disestablishments in England
Aerospace companies of the United Kingdom
Aircraft manufacturers of the United Kingdom
British companies disestablished in 1999
British companies established in 1977
Companies based in Farnborough
Companies formerly listed on the London Stock Exchange
Defence companies of the United Kingdom
Defunct aircraft manufacturers of the United Kingdom
Defunct companies of the United Kingdom
Former defence companies of the United Kingdom
Former nationalised industries of the United Kingdom
Manufacturing companies disestablished in 1999
Manufacturing companies established in 1977
Space programme of the United Kingdom
Technology companies disestablished in 1999
Technology companies established in 1977